Allistar Clarke (born October 3, 1990) is a Saint Kittitian and Nevisian sprinter. He was part of his country's team in the men's 4 × 100 metres relay race at the 2016 Summer Olympics.

References

1990 births
Athletes (track and field) at the 2015 Pan American Games
Athletes (track and field) at the 2016 Summer Olympics
Living people
Olympic athletes of Saint Kitts and Nevis
Pan American Games competitors for Saint Kitts and Nevis
Saint Kitts and Nevis male sprinters